Millennium Metal – Chapter One is the debut album by the German power metal band Metalium. It was released in 1999 by the German label Massacre Records and distributed in the USA by Pavement Music. Millennium Metal is a concept album and the first chapter of the ongoing saga of the mythic warrior Metalium. The story continues on their second album, State of Triumph - Chapter Two, released the following year.

Track listing

Personnel 
Band members
 Henning Basse - lead vocals
 Chris Caffery - guitars, co-producer
 Matthias Lange - guitars
 Lars Ratz - bass, producer, mixing
 Mike Terrana - drums, narration

Additional musicians
 Ferdy Doernberg, JP Genkel - keyboards
 Roland Grapow - guitar solo on "Metalium"
 John Osborn - drums (touring only)

Production
 JP Genkel - engineer, mixing
 Tommy Hansen - pre-mastering
 Alexander Krull - mastering

References

External links 
 Metalium Official Website

Metalium albums
1999 debut albums
Massacre Records albums